Bela is a town in Gaya district of Bihar state, India.

References

External links
 Satellite map of Bela

Cities and towns in Gaya district